Shaddick is a surname. Notable people with the surname include:

Maggie Shaddick (1926–2019)
Rowland Shaddick (1920–1994), English cricketer